Grania Rosette Makatu Rubomboras (née Grania Makatu) is a Ugandan electrical engineer and corporate executive. She is the Programme Officer, Power Project of the Nile Equatorial Lakes Subsidiary Action Program, based in Kigali, Rwanda, where she heads the Power Development and Trade Department.

Background and education
She was born in Uganda and attended local schools for her primary education. She attended Gayaza High School, specializing in Physics, Chemistry and Mathematics. She studied engineering at Makerere University, graduating with a Bachelor of Science in electrical engineering in 1978. Later, she obtained a Master of Business Administration, from Makerere University Business School. She also holds a Master of Science in Project Managemnt, awarded by Boston University.

Career
After a period of absence from Uganda, Rubomboras joined the now defunct "Uganda Electricity Board" in 1992. She rose through the ranks to the position of Managing Director, by 2003. When UEB was dissolved in 2004, Rubomboras spent several years as a Manager Project Planning at the "Rural Electrification Agency, where she was Heading the Planning Department".

In her role as regional project manager of the Nile Equatorial Lakes Subsidiary Action Program, Interconnection of Electric Grids Project, and after as head of the Power Development and Trade department. Her department is responsible for five main initiatives: 1. The interconnection of the electricity grids of Burundi, the Democratic Republic of the Congo, Kenya, Rwanda and Uganda. 2. The development of Rusumo Hydroelectric Power Station 3. Feasibility studies to assess the proposed interconnection of the Tanzanian grid to that of Zambia. 4. Development of interconnection between the electricity grids of Uganda and the Democratic Republic of the Congo and 5. Development of the Uganda - South Sudan electricity interconnection.

Personal life
Rubomboras is a mother of two – a daughter named Emily and a son named Albert.

Other considerations
In May 2017, Rubomboras was recognized for her work in integrating the national electricity grid networks of five member-countries of the Nile Basin Initiative, namely: Burundi, Democratic Republic of Congo, Kenya, Rwanda and Uganda. The recognition was at the annual "African Utility Week Power Industry Awards" held in Cape Town, South Africa, on 17 May 2017.

See also
 Umeme Limited

References

External links
High power costs set to reduce
Locals await compensation over power lines

Year of birth missing (living people)
Living people
Toro people
Ugandan women engineers
Ugandan electrical engineers
People from Western Region, Uganda
Makerere University alumni
Boston University alumni
Makerere University Business School alumni
People educated at Gayaza High School
21st-century women engineers
21st-century Ugandan women scientists
21st-century Ugandan scientists